Frank Edoho is a TV host, filmmaker, and photographer. He is the host of the popular Nigerian TV show called Who wants to be a Millionaire.

Personal life 
Frank was married to Katherine Obiang with three children before they separated in 2011. He then married his second wife, Sandra Onyenuchenuya. On 2 April 2014, Frank and Sandra welcomed their first child together (Frank's fourth) and their second child was born two years later in the US.

Education and career 

Frank studied animal science at University of Calabar. While in school, he was a rap artiste with the stage name Mc Frank. After graduation, he started his broadcasting career as a presenter at the Cross River State Broadcasting Corporation and also anchored a breakfast television show for the Nigerian Television Authority, Channel 9, Calabar. Frank moved to Metro FM 97.6 in 1999 where he anchored radio shows for the radio station. He was however brought into limelight by the popular show, Who Wants To Be A Millionaire. Aside from being a TV host, he is also a voice over artist, photographer, producer and a filmmaker. After he rejected a new deal to continue as host of Who wants to be a Millionaire, he was unveiled alongside Emmanuel Essien, popularly known as Mannie, as the host of an international TV show, The Price Is Right. Frank is respected for his eloquent voice and has performed a number of voice overs for radio ads and radio jungles for Vogue Fruit Juice, First City Monument Bank, Unilever Nigeria Plc, International Bank Plc and Elizade Toyota.

Who Wants To Be A Millionaire 
Frank Edoho hosted the popular TV game show for 13 years from 2004 to 2017 but resigned on 2 September 2017. He announced his departure via his official Twitter page after failing to agree on terms with Ultima Studios. Edoho denied being "dropped" by the organizers of the show, maintaining that he "declined the offer" that was given to him. In February 2022, he made a return to the show.

Award and recognition 

 Youth Ambassador Award by Fly Networks
 Best TV presenter of the year 2006 by City People Magazine Award
 Male TV presenter of the year 2008 by Nigeria Kids Choice Award

References

Living people
University of Calabar alumni
People from Lagos State
Nigerian television presenters
Nigerian radio presenters
1972 births